This is a list of Portuguese television related events from 1994.

Events
Unknown - The first series of Chuva de Estrelas was won by Sara Tavares performing as Whitney Houston.

Debuts

International
 Ferry Boat Fred (RTP)
 Bertie the Bat (RTP)

Television shows

1990s
Chuva de Estrelas (1993-2000)

Ending this year

Births

Deaths